The 1974 Dutch Grand Prix was a Formula One motor race held at Circuit Zandvoort on 23 June 1974. It was race 8 of 15 in both the 1974 World Championship of Drivers and the 1974 International Cup for Formula One Manufacturers.

Classification

Qualifying

*Positions with a pink background indicate drivers that failed to qualify

Race

Championship standings after the race

Drivers' Championship standings

Constructors' Championship standings

 Note: Only the top five positions are included for both sets of standings. Only the best 7 results from the first 8 races and the best 6 results from the last 7 races counted towards the Championship. Numbers without parentheses are Championship points; numbers in parentheses are total points scored.

References

External links

Dutch Grand Prix
Dutch Grand Prix
1974 in Dutch motorsport
June 1974 sports events in Europe